Harold Arthur MacKenzie (1922 – August 15, 2012) was a Canadian politician, who represented Ottawa Centre in the Legislative Assembly of Ontario from 1967 to 1971 as a Liberal member.

MacKenzie was elected in the general election in 1967. During the 28th Legislative Assembly of Ontario he served on six Standing Committees of the Legislative Assembly.

Born in Truro, Nova Scotia, MacKenzie served as an officer on HMCS Uganda during the Second World War, then returned to Canada and became a Professional Engineer, working in both a private practice and then, ultimately, with the Department of Defense, in Ottawa.

MacKenzie was married and had three daughters.

References

External links 
 

1922 births
2012 deaths
Ontario Liberal Party MPPs
People from Truro, Nova Scotia
Canadian military personnel of World War II